Greek submarine Xifias ("swordfish") can refer to two ships of the Hellenic Navy:

 , French-built submarine, in service 1913–1920
  or Xiphias, the former British HMS Untiring, in Greek service 1945–1952 

Hellenic Navy ship names